Bursa verrucosa is a species of large sea snail, a marine gastropod mollusc in the family Bursidae, known as the frog shells.

Distribution
This species is found in portions of Australia, New Zealand, and the Kermadec Islands, in moderate water depths.

References

Bursidae
Gastropods described in 1825
Taxa named by George Brettingham Sowerby I